Sanish is an unincorporated community in Mountrail County, North Dakota, United States.

Description
The present community of Sanish was established in 1953, when the original Sanish townsite was inundated by Lake Sakakawea. Old Sanish, as the original town is now known, was a Native American community; after its evacuation, its residents moved to Sanish and New Town.

References

External links

Former municipalities in North Dakota
Unincorporated communities in Mountrail County, North Dakota
Unincorporated communities in North Dakota
Populated places established in 1953
1953 establishments in North Dakota
Mandan, Hidatsa, and Arikara Nation